James or Jim Park may refer to:

Sports
Jim Park (baseball) (1892–1970), American baseball pitcher
Jim Park (footballer, born 1875) (1875–1919), Australian rules footballer for Essendon
Jim Park (footballer, born 1910) (1910–1943), Australian rules footballer for Collingwood
Jim Park (ice hockey) (born 1952), Canadian former ice hockey goaltender

Others
James Park (VC) (1835–1858), recipient of the Victoria Cross
James Park (geologist) (1857–1946), New Zealand geologist, director of school of mines, university professor and writer
James Alan Park (1763–1838), British judge
James Park (entrepreneur), American tech entrepreneur, co-founder and CEO of Fitbit
James L. Park, theoretic physicist

See also
James Parke (disambiguation)
James Parks (disambiguation)
James Parkes (disambiguation)